Akatek or Acatec may refer to:
 Akatek people, an ethnic group of Guatemala
 Akatek language, a Mayan language

See also
 acatech, the German Academy of Science and Engineering

Language and nationality disambiguation pages